Daydream is the eighth studio album by Welsh classical crossover artist Katherine Jenkins and was released on 10 October 2011. The album was her second with Warner Bros.

Track listing

International edition

Certifications

References

Katherine Jenkins albums
2011 albums